Cellulosimicrobium is a Gram-positive bacterial genus from the family Promicromonosporaceae. Cellulosimicrobium bacteria can cause infections in humans. This genus has been found to be part of the salivary microbiome.

References

Further reading 
 
 
 
 
 

Actinomycetota
Micrococcales
Bacteria genera